The Cooper T76 is an open-wheel Formula 3 race car, designed, developed and built by British manufacturer Cooper in 1965. It was powered by either a  Cosworth MAE or BMC naturally-aspirated four-cylinder engine, which drove the rear wheels through a Hewland Mk5/6 manual transmission. It also featured reworked front and rear suspension, as well as variable anti-roll bars. Chassis design and construction was a tubular space frame. The car was essentially a modified variant of the previous T72. The rocker arm leverage ratio at the front of the car was altered from 2:1 to 1:3 to aid in the location and life of the shock absorber. The "anti-squat" system out of the rear suspension, and variable Armstrong shocks were installed. Rear-facing radius rods were linked to the front rocker arms to mitigate the forces felt under braking.

References

Cooper racing cars
1960s cars
Cars of England
Formula Three cars
Open wheel racing cars